Mamuka "Ushangi" Mamulashvili is a Georgian military unit leader who currently commands the Georgian Legion.

Early life
Mamuka Mamulashvili was born on 22 April 1978 in Tbilisi, the capital of the then Georgian Soviet Socialist Republic in the Soviet Union. His father was a Georgian military officer, Zurab Mamulashvili. His sister, Nona Mamulashvili, is a politician and deputy of Parliament of Georgia. She is a member of the United National Movement party.

Abkhaz–Georgian conflict
Mamulashvili fought for Georgia in the War in Abkhazia (1992–1993) when he was 14, alongside his father who was a Georgian military officer. Mamulashvili later recalled, "My first war was in the 1990s, in Abkhazia." During the war he was captured by Abkhaz forces and held for three months before being released.

First Chechen War
Mamulashvili fought as a foreign volunteer against Russian forces in the First Chechen War (1994–1996).

Return to Georgia
After the First Chechen War, Mamulashvili traveled to Paris to finish his education. He then returned to Georgia and served as a senior military advisor to Georgian president Mikheil Saakashvili.

Mamulashvili fought for Georgia in the Russo-Georgian War of 2008.

Ukraine
Mamulashvili moved to Ukraine in 2013 in order to support the Euromaidan.

Georgian Legion

In 2014, Mamulashvili was one of the founding members of the Ukrainian Georgian Legion and is currently leading it against the 2022 Russian invasion. He took part in the Battle of Hostomel Airport.

Mamulashvili supports a no-fly zone to be placed over Ukraine, which he says is necessary to prevent Russian airstrikes.

Awards
3rd degree Order of Vakhtang Gorgasali (1992)
Order of the People's Hero of Ukraine
Order for Courage
Cross of Ivan Mazepa
Medal "For Sacrifice and Love for Ukraine"

References

External links
 Мамука Мамулашвілі розповів чому Грузія воює в Україні
 Командир грузинского легиона на Донбассе

1978 births
Living people
Foreign volunteers in Chechnya
Military personnel from Tbilisi
Ukrainian military personnel of the 2022 Russian invasion of Ukraine
Military personnel of the Russo-Georgian War
People of the Euromaidan
Recipients of the Cross of Ivan Mazepa
Recipients of the Order For Courage, 3rd class
Ukrainian military personnel of the war in Donbas
Child soldiers
Foreign volunteers in the 2022 Russian invasion of Ukraine